Quebec 2002 was an unsuccessful bid by Quebec City, Canada, and the Canadian Olympic Committee to host the 2002 Winter Olympics. This was the city's first time to bid. Canada had previously hosted the 1988 Olympic Winter Games in Calgary, Alberta and would go on to successfully bid and host the 2010 Olympic Winter Games in Vancouver.

Venues 

The proposed venues concept would be based in Quebec City:

Non-competition venues 
 Ceremonies (Temporary amphitheater at the Plains of Abraham)
 EXPOCité – International Broadcast Center
 Quebec Convention Centre – Main Press Center
 Laval University – Athletes' Village

Existing venues 
 Colisée de Québec – Ice Hockey I (Men)
 Youth Pavilion – Figure Skating and Short Track Speed Skating
 Gaétan Boucher Speed Skating Oval – Speed Skating
 Saint-Romuald Arena – Curling
 PEPS Arena, University of Laval – Ice Hockey II (Women)
 CFB Valcartier – Biathlon
 Le Massif – Alpine Skiing (Women's Downhill, Combined and Super G)
 Stoneham – Alpine Skiing (Men's and Women's Slalom)
 Mont Ste-Anne – Alpine Skiing (Men's Giant Slalom), Cross Country Skiing and Nordic Combined
 Le Relais – Freestyle Skiing

New venues 
 Cap du Salut or Acropoles des Draveurs– Alpine Skiing (Men's Downhill and Combination)
 Stoneham (Mont-Hibou)– Nordic Combined, Ski Jumping and Sliding Events (Bobsleigh and Luge)

Bid's evaluation 
The IOC evaluation report praised the bid, stating that it was considered the strongest of all the bidding cities. However, reservations were made by the International Ski Federation with regards to the proposed Men's Downhill venue, as a ramp would have been necessary to accommodate the necessary 800 meter vertical drop, whilst barges would be placed along the river St. Lawrence. in order to accommodate a finishing area. An alternative site located inland at Acropole des Draveurs, would have provided the 800 meter vertical, but the site would have required major development. Some locals and government officials flagged the 25 million dollar temporary venue as rather pointless and despite the proposal incorporating a tunnel for a train line which runs along the mountain range.

Other proposals, such as staging the Men's Downhill events in Calgary were also considered, but deemed unrealistic.

Aftermath 

During the 104th IOC meeting held in Budapest the bid got 7 votes and lost in the first round to Salt Lake City.

References 
 Notes

2002 Winter Olympics bids
2002 in Canadian sports